The Scaliger Tombs (Italian: Arche scaligere) is a group of five Gothic funerary monuments in Verona, Italy, celebrating the Scaliger family, who ruled in Verona from the 13th to the late 14th century.

The tombs are located in a court outside the church of Santa Maria Antica, separated from the street by a wall with iron grilles.  Built in Gothic style, they are a series of tombs, mostly freestanding open tabernacle-like structures rising high above the ground, with a sarcophagus surmounted by an elaborate baldachin, topped by a statue of the deceased, mounted and wearing armour. According to the French historian Georges Duby, they are one of the most outstanding examples of Gothic art.

Description
The tombs are placed within an enclosure of wrought iron grilles decorated with a stair motif, referring to the name of the della Scala family, meaning "of the stairs" in Italian. The stone pillars of the enclosure have statues of saints. The tombs are those of the following notable members of the Scaliger dynasty:
 Cangrande I. This was the first tomb built, in the 14th century, according to the will of the deceased, the most famous Scaliger ruler of the city. The designer was the architect of the church of Sant'Anastasia, who planned it in the shape of a Gothic tabernacle, supported by richly harnessed dogs (Cangrande meaning "Big dog" in Italian). Unlike the later tabernacles, it is built out from the church wall, over a doorway, rather than being free-standing. On the sarcophagus lies a recumbent effigy statue of the lord, characterized by an unusual smile. The sarcophagus is decorated on each side by high reliefs with religious themes and low reliefs with military themes. On the summit of the baldachin is an equestrian statue of Cangrande, now replaced by a copy (the original is in the museum of Castelvecchio).
 Mastino II. Begun in 1345, this tomb was modified during its construction. It was originally painted and gilt, and is enclosed by a railing with four statues of the Virtues at the corners. The faces of the funerary urn are decorated by religious motifs; on the sepulchre cover lies again the deceased's statue, guarded by two angels. The baldachin has religious themes sculpted on the pediment, and is also surmounted by an equestrian statue of Mastino II.
 Cansignorio. Dating from 1375, and the most richly decorated. It was designed by Bonino da Campione, and has sculptures portraying warrior saints, Gospel figures, the Virtues and the Apostles, and a large equestrian statue of Cansignorio.
 Alberto II. Unlike the others, it has no baldachin but only a sarcophagus, though richly decorated. It dates from 1301.
 Giovanni. This monument is built into the wall of the church. It was finished in 1359 by Andriolo de' Santi, and until 1400 it was located in the church of San Fermo Maggiore, before being moved to join the others.

The tomb of Cansignorio della Scala has been copied in the Brunswick Monument (1879) in Geneva, Switzerland.

Gallery

External links

 

14th-century architecture
Monuments and memorials in Italy
Buildings and structures in Verona
Gothic sculptures
Tourist attractions in Verona